Flap Your Wings is the tenth studio release, and ninth full-length studio album, by Christian alternative rock band the Choir, released in 2000. It earned the band its first Grammy Award nomination.

Background
After the band's "To Bid Farewell" tour documented by the live album Let It Fly, the members of the Choir moved onto other projects. Lead singer and guitarist Derri Daugherty and drummer and lyricist Steve Hindalong began working with a variety of other contemporary Christian artists such as Common Children, White Heart, Phil Madeira, Julie Miller and the Newsboys, in either production or musical capacities. Hindalong also released his first solo album, Skinny, in 1997. Daugherty continued his side gig with the Lost Dogs, which released two albums during this period, The Green Room Serenade, Part One and Gift Horse. Bass guitarist Tim Chandler went back to work with Terry Taylor on his solo, Daniel Amos and Swirling Eddies projects, while sax and Lyricon player Dan Michaels continued in artist management at Benson Records. 

Hindalong and Daugherty had their greatest success with the City on a Hill worship music series, released in mid-2000. The lead single from the initial album, Songs of Worship and Praise, was "God of Wonders," co-written by Hindalong and Marc Byrd; it held the #1 spot on the Christian adult contemporary charts for several weeks, and would become one of the most successful worship songs of the early 2000s. The project would later receive a Dove Award in 2001 for Special Event Album of the Year.

During this hiatus for the Choir, Michaels decided to create an official website for the band, where they could directly interact with fans as well as sell music and merchandise. This site was launched at the very time that the internet was becoming a new paradigm for indie rock artists, as a band with an established fanbase like the Choir no longer needed to tour relentlessly to keep listeners eager for new music. However, it was a one-off concert at a music festival in Albuquerque, New Mexico during the summer of 1999 that finally convinced the members of the Choir to work on new music together.

Recording and production
On Thanksgiving weekend of 1999, Chandler flew out to Nashville, Tennessee for a writing and recording session, and the result was five new songs. In May 2000, Chandler returned to Nashville, and the band wrote an additional five songs. The Choir suddenly had an album's worth of new material.

This second recording session took place mere weeks after the death of Gene Eugene, lead singer and songwriter for Adam Again, who had died suddenly on the floor of his recording studio, The Green Room, in Huntington Beach, California. Eugene, a prolific producer and engineer, was a close personal friend of the band — Michaels in particular — and had worked on a number of their releases. At only 38 years old, Eugene's death was a shock, and as a result, the song "Hey Gene" was created in response, incorporating lines from Michaels' eulogy at the funeral.

"Mercy Lives Here" was the first time since Voices in Shadows that Daugherty wrote the lyrics as well as the music to a Choir song. Originally intended for a solo album, the song was inspired by his visit to a bar in Akron, Ohio filled with a strange assortment of characters. The album's closing song, "Beautiful Scandalous Night," was a re-recording of the same song from the worship record At the Foot of the Cross, Volume One: Clouds, Rain, Fire from 1992.

Artwork and packaging
The cover painting for Flap Your Wings, described by one critic as "equal parts representation and abstraction," was done by Michael Knott, the frontman for Lifesavers Underground and the co-founder of Blonde Vinyl Records. Knott continues to create art and sell his work online.

Release
Flap Your Wings was strategically released just one day before the band performed live at the 2000 Cornerstone Festival, which served as a launching pad for the new release. The album was released on CD only, and independently, as Galaxy21 Records — which would release future Choir albums — had not yet been founded. Because the band viewed the new album as a response to their most avid fans, only 8,000 copies were manufactured. "Hey Gene" was released as the first single from the album.

Given the album's independent status and limited release, the members of the Choir were surprised to learn that Flap Your Wings was nominated in the Best Rock Gospel Album category for the 44th Annual Grammy Awards, which were held in 2002. Although placing first in an online poll conducted by Christianity Today as to which artist deserved to win the Grammy that year, DC Talk took home the award for the album Solo.

Response

Critical reaction
Critical reaction at the time was positive. Writing in CCM Magazine, critic Dave Urbanski said that Flap Your Wings was a "decidedly delicate mix of the band's best musical elements from its '90s catalog, and although there's not a whole lot new here musically, The Choir does throw in a few pleasant surprises." He called the lead single "Hey Gene" "an energetic pop-rock gem," adding that it was "the most rock oriented tune on the record — and the obvious centerpiece." With the inclusion of the worship song "Beautiful Scandalous Night," Urbanski summed up Flap Your Wings as "a fine record with more than enough shining moments." Cross Rhythms gave the album a perfect ten, with critic Mike Rimmer writing that the album was "classic Choir," with "well-crafted songs and warm production." He added that "Flap Your Wings sees humanity and eternity meeting in a collection of songs that build on the foundation of their best work." The Phantom Tollbooth was especially effusive, naming Flap Your Wings the August 2000 Pick of the Month, and included three separate reviews. In the lead review, critic Michial Farmer claimed that Flap Your Wings was an "immediate contender for best album of 2000." Although critical of some "missteps" like the drum machine in "Flowing Over Me" and the re-recording of "Beautiful Scandalous Night" not "[reaching] the magnitude of the original," he praised "Mercy Lives Here" for avoiding "the cheesiness and banality typical of modern worship, and [it aims] at the brain as much as the heart."

Retrospectively, Flap Your Wings has also received praise. Mark Allan Powell, writing in the Encyclopedia of Contemporary Christian Music, called the album a "warm, relaxed, and generally gentle record," adding that it "revives their atmospheric tradition, with perhaps a little Radiohead influence showing around the edges." He praised the title track's "profoundly spiritual lyrics," and called "Hey Gene" "the highlight of the album." "As sentimental as any Bob Carlisle song," Powell added, "it recalls the mercy their friend always showed them, sheds a few tears over his absence, and then bids him adieu."

Accolades
 Christianity Today
 Readers' Poll: Most Deserving – 2002 Grammy Awards

Awards and nominations
 44th Annual Grammy Awards (2002) – Best Rock Gospel Album (nomination)

Track listing
All lyrics by Steve Hindalong and all music by Derri Daugherty, unless otherwise noted.

Personnel
The Choir
 Derri Daugherty – lead vocals, guitars, drums, loops, keyboards
 Steve Hindalong – drums, percussion, keyboards, vocals, xylophone
 Tim Chandler – bass guitar, guitar, vocals
 Dan Michaels – saxophone, tenor saxophone

Additional musicians
 Julian Kindred – effects, electronics
 Christine Glass – vocals
 Emily Hindalong – trumpet postlude to "Sunny"
 Phil Madeira – Mellotron (flutes, strings), lap steel guitar
 Jacob Lawson – violin

Production
 "Buckeye" Dan Michaels – executive producer
 Derri Daugherty – producer, engineer
 Steve Hindalong – producer
 Tim Chandler – producer
 Julian Kindred – additional production, recording, mixing
 Terry Taylor – additional production
 Ken Love – mastering (Master Mix)
 Michael Knott – front cover painting
 Andy Conant – layout, photography, design

References
Footnotes

Bibliography

External links
 

2000 albums
The Choir (alternative rock band) albums